The Rider on the White Horse (also known as Der Schimmelreiter) is 1978 German film directed by Alfred Weidenmann.

Plot

Background 
The film is the second of the three German film adaptations of The Rider on the White Horse by Theodor Storm.  Weidenmann’s version is noted for its emphasis on issues of the time and  its use of  comparatively more fantasy features.

Analysis 
The Lexikon des Internationalen Films states that the film contains 'atmospheric landscape shots' and that 'the social conflict recedes in favor of the tragic love story, which Weidenmann extensively plays out.' while the  Große Personenlexikon des Films finds the film 'staged in an overly banal manner'.

Cast 
 John Phillip Law as Hauke Haien
 Gert Fröbe as Tede Volkerts
 Anita Ekström as Elke Haien
 Dirk Galuba as Ole Peters
 Vera Tschechowa as Vollina Harders
 Reinhard Kolldehoff as Jess Harders
 Lina Carstens as Trin Jans
 Werner Hinz as Amtmann in Husum
 Richard Lauffen as Jewe Manners
 Katharina Mayberg as Ann Grete
 Peter Kuiper

See also
The Rider on the White Horse (1934)

References

External links

1978 films
German drama films
1970s German films
1978 drama films
Films directed by Alfred Weidenmann
West German films
Remakes of German films
Flood films
Films based on German novels
Films based on works by Theodor Storm
Films set in the 18th century
1970s German-language films